Sergei Jürgens is an Estonian politician. In 2009, he attempted to create a unified list of Russian minority candidates for the 2009 European Parliament election, but failed. From 2011 to 2012, he was Chairman of the Constitution Party. After the party merged with the Estonian Left Party to form the Estonian United Left Party, Jürgens became co-chairman of the new party. In this position, Jürgens began negotiations for a possible merge of the United Left Party with the Estonian Centre Party.

References

Living people
Year of birth missing (living people)
Estonian politicians